Beycesultan is an archaeological site in western Anatolia, located about 5 km southwest of the modern-day city of Çivril in the Denizli Province of Turkey. It lies in a bend of an old tributary of Büyük Menderes River (Maeander River).

History

Late Chalcolithic
Beycesultan was occupied beginning in the Late Chalcolithic period. This large mound is almost 1 km in diameter and 25 m high.

Early Bronze
The settlement increased in size and prominence through the 3rd millennium, with notable religious and civil buildings.

Middle Bronze

Development peaked early in the 2nd millennium with the construction of a massive palace and associated structures. The palace was abandoned and then destroyed circa 1700 BC. To this point, the orientation of Beycesultan was strongly influenced from the west, mainly the Aegean and Crete.

Late Bronze
After a few centuries of semi-abandonment, Beycesultan began to
rise again, this time more influenced by the Hittite regions of
Anatolia. Though smaller than the earlier city, the site was
of impressive size. This second flowering of Beycesultan was
completely destroyed circa 1200 BC as were many locations in
Anatolia at that time.

Later Periods
The site was also the occupied, to a lesser scale, in
the Byzantine, Seljuk and Ottoman period. It has been hypothesized that it is the Byzantine town and bishopry "Ilouza" (Ιλούζα), and possibly the Hittite Wilusa. However, Fred Woudhuizen, maintains that the name of the site can be positively identified as Mira based on epigraphic testimony.

Archaeology

The site of Beycesultan consists of two mounds, divided by the old trading road. The maximum height of 25 meters is at the western mound and the entire site is around a kilometer in diameter.

In early 1950s James Mellaart discovered specimens of "champagne-glass" style pottery in a Late Bronze Age context near the site. A search identified the höyük (mound) of Beycesultan upstream of the Menderes river.

Seton Lloyd, along with James Mellaart, excavated Beycesultan on behalf of the British Institute of Archaeology at Ankara for six seasons from 1954 to 1959 with each dig lasting around two months.

A renewed survey of the site and its region was conducted from 2002 to 2007 by Eşref Abay of the Ege University and new excavations at the site conducted under his direction beginning in 2007. Work continues to the
present in conjunction with Adnan Menderes University.

While no epigraphic material has been found as yet, a few seals have been recovered.

The early excavators reported "a row of small houses that had been destroyed by fire", with the champagne-glass pottery. There was also a palace "whose plan suggested ... Knossos", which was cleared out before its destruction:

At one entrance of the palace was a kind of bathroom, where visitors washed themselves before making their bows at court. One odd feature of the inner chambers: floors raised about a yard above the ground. Beneath the floors were small passages. They suggest air ducts of a heating system, but nothing of the sort is known to have existed until 1,000 years later.

Outside the palace,
Most interesting was a row of little shops. One was a Bronze Age pub with sunken vats for the wine supply and a lavish supply of glasses for serving the customers. It also had knucklebones, a gambling game that did the duty of a modern bar's chuck-a-luck.

Notes

See also
Cities of the ancient Near East

References
Seton Lloyd and James Mellaart, Beycesultan I. The Chalcolithic and Early Bronze Age Levels, Occasional Publication of the British Institute of Archaeology at Ankara, no. 6, 1962
Seton Lloyd, Beycesultan II. Middle Bronze Age Architecture and Pottery, Occasional Publication of the British Institute of Archaeology at Ankara, no. 8, 1962
James Mellaart and Ann Murray, Beycesultan III pt. 1. Late Bronze Age architecture, Occasional Publication of the British Institute of Archaeology at Ankara, 1995, 
James Mellaart and Ann Murray, Beycesultan III pt. 2. Late Bronze Age and Phrygian Pottery and Middle and Late Bronze Age Small Objects, Occasional Publication of the British Institute of Archaeology at Ankara, 1995,

External links
Beycesultan Excavations - British Institute of Archaeology at Ankara
 Idol from Beycesultan, Turkey - 3rd Millennium - Harvard Art Museums
 4,000-year-old textile mill unearthed in western Turkey - Hürriyet Daily News September 24 2020
 
 

Hittite cities
Archaeological sites of ancient Anatolia
Former populated places in Turkey
Archaeological sites in the Aegean Region
History of Denizli Province
Buildings and structures in Denizli Province